The siege of Janjira (1682) was a military conflict fought between Maratha and Siddis of Janjira,the allies of Mughal Empire.Maratha Emperor Sambhaji personally besieged the fort of Murud-Janjira to stop Siddi's intrusions into Maratha Territories and to capture the strategically important fort Janjira.

Background 
Mughal emperor Aurangzeb had arrived in the Deccan to conquer the Deccan Plateau in 1681. His first goal was to conquer the newly established Maratha Empire in Maharashtra. Aurangzeb wanted to encircle the Maratha Empire from all sides. He ordered his allies and enemies of Maratha Empire such as Siddis of Janjira, Wodeyars of Mysore and Portuguese of Goa to attack the Maratha Empire. In addition Sambhaji Raje knew the strategic importance of Janjira, he had an ambition to capture it. Hence, Sambhaji Raje decided to capture Janjira personally.

Plan of Marathas 
Sambhaji Raje had planned to Janjira by ruse, he had sent a party in 1681 under the leadership of senior Maratha General Kondaji Farzand under the pretext of a fake fight with Sambhaji Raje. Kondaji and his men told Siddi about their fight with Sambhaji and asked for a post in his army. Siddi Khairiyat was happy at the defection of Kondaji at his side. The Siddi brothers made Kondaji a sardar in their army. But actually Sambhaji Raje had sent Kondaji and his men to  the ammunition storage on the fort in order to capture the fort.

Siege of Janjira 
Sambhaji Raje personally attacked Janjira in 1682. He had a 20,000 strong army, 300 ships of the Maratha navy and Maratha artillery assisting him. Maratha admirals Mainak Bhandari, Dariya Sarang and Daulat Khan were commanding the navy. Arab admiral Jange Khan was also helping the Marathas. Siddi forces in the Maratha territories retreated to Janjira fort after seeing such a large army. Sambhaji Raje recaptured the villages surrounding Janjira.

Sambhaji Raje then launched a fierce attack on Janjira. Maratha artillery started to damage the fort walls. The Siddis were also responding strongly with their artillery.

Meanwhile, on the Janjira fort, Kondaji and his men were looking for an opportunity to light the ammunition storage on the fort so as to allow Sambhaji Raje to attack the fort using the ensuing panic on the fort.

300 ships of the Maratha navy were trying to attack the fort but the strong artillery of Siddis somehow managed to defend the fort. Both sides had suffered great losses and nobody was able to gain an upper hand. Sambhaji Raje had maintained a constant pressure on Janjira and his artillery managed to inflict heavy damage to the fort walls. The siege continued for thirty days. Maratha Navy had blockaded Janjira from three sides cutting of any supplies to the fort. Maratha forces started constructing a bridge from shoreline to the fort. The bridge had started to take shape. Siddis were caught in a dire situation and were battling a severe food shortage. The Siddis realised that if the same situation continues for a few days then Sambhaji Raje will capture the fort in a matter of 4–5 days.  Hence they pleaded to Aurangzeb for help.

Aurangzeb was well aware of the strategic importance of Janjira. He immediately sent his General Husain Ali Khan to destroy Kalyan and Bhiwandi regions with a 35,000 strong force to divert Sambhaji Raje's attack on Janjira. Husain Ali Khan destroyed Kalyan and Bhiwandi was threatening to attack Raigad, the Maratha Capital. Sambhaji Raje had almost captured Janjira but he was forced to retreat from Janjira to check Husain Ali Khan's advance. In absence of Sambhaji Raje, his naval commander Dadaji Raghunath Deshpande of Mahad took control of the siege. Sambhaji Raje later on defeated and pushed back Husain Ali Khan to Ahmadnagar but Janjira was saved due to his advance on Kalyan-Bhiwandi. Sambhaji Raje was unable to capture the Janjira fort. Nevertheless, he was able to inflict heavy damage to fort. It was an important strategic victory for the Marathas as the Siddis stopped their activities in the Maratha territories and never ventured against the Marathas in Sambhaji Raje's reign.

Aftermath 
Siddis had suffered great losses in the siege. They got to know about the superior strength of the Marathas under Sambhaji. They decided not to venture out against the Marathas. In the next few years Aurangzeb repeatedly pleaded them to open a campaign against the Marathas but the Siddis were not ready to fight against the Marathas.

See also 
Mughal–Maratha Wars
Sambhaji
Murud Janjira
Battles involving the Maratha Empire

References  

Maratha Navy
Janjira
Janjira
Janjira
Naval battles involving Marathas